Balnibarbi is an extinct genus of trilobites in the family Olenidae. They are known from fossils excavated in Norway. They lived during the early part of the Arenig stage of the Ordovician Period, a faunal stage that occurred about 479 to 472 million years ago.

The genus is ancestral to, and co-existed sympatrically with, the better-known Cloacaspis.

It was named for the fictional country of Balnibarbi featured in Gulliver's Travels, a place "populated by eccentric natural philosophers."

Species include:
Balnibarbi ceryx
Balnibarbi erugata
Balnibarbi pulvurea
Balnibarbi scimitar
Balnibarbi sombrero
Balnibarbi tholia

References

Early Ordovician trilobites of Europe
Fossils of Norway
Olenina
Ptychopariida genera